Dougy  is a young adult novel written by James Moloney and first published in 1993 by University of Queensland Press. By 2013 the National Library of Australia listed 18 editions of the novel in a variety of formats including book, audio book, braille and e-book. It is the first book in the Gracey trilogy, followed by Gracey (1994) and Angela (1998)  In 1994 it was an Honour Book in the category of Older Readers in the Children's Book Council of Australia Awards. James Moloney taught for 2 years in outback Queensland and his observation from that time developed into the novel.  "I watched aboriginal children growing up, the difficulties they faced, the close family relations that mean so much and the ingrained prejudice of the dominant white culture around them." The book is dedicated to Douglas Collins, a student Moloney taught, who collapsed and died during a rugby game.

Nothing but admiration.
True soldier of the 20th
Rampant Lion.
Irreplaceable Brother.

Plot summary 
The story as told by Dougy tells us about an aboriginal family living in a dump in Australia. Dougy is thirteen years old and lives in government subsidised housing with a seldom seen alcoholic father. His sister Gracey is a talented runner who wins a scholarship to a private school and this leads to resentment from the white community who see it as another government handout.          The blacks and whites live an uneasy co-existence, but when an alarming incident occurs the underlying racial tension surfaces and violence erupts.

Themes 
There are several themes in the book relevant to teenagers and these make it useful as a set text in senior schools  
 Relationships: between Dougy and Gracey and their family, mistrust between black and white communities; the closeness and support within the black community
 Identity: Dougy and Gracey lack of knowledge of and interest in their Aboriginality
 Racial issues: the uneasy co-existence of the black and white communities; resentment by white of blacks receiving government money; stereotyped attitudes
 Aboriginal Spirituality: connection to the land and stories through the legend of the Moodagudda

The Gracey Trilogy 
The Gracey Trilogy includes:
 Dougy (Book 1)
 Gracey  (Book 2)
 Angela  (Book 3)

References

External links 

 http://www.jamesmoloney.com.au/

1993 Australian novels
Novels by James Moloney
Australian children's novels
Novels set in Queensland
Novels set in Brisbane
University of Queensland Press books
1993 children's books